Sanderson is an unincorporated community in Baker County, Florida, United States. The main road through Sanderson is U.S. Route 90, which is intersected by County Roads 229 and 127. Sanderson is also the headquarters of the Baker County Road Department. The town was named after John Pease Sanderson.

Sanderson is home to a cannabis cultivation facility, as well as several other small manufacturing concerns, due to the towns easy access to I10.

References

External links
 Baker County Florida Community Home Page

Unincorporated communities in Baker County, Florida
Unincorporated communities in the Jacksonville metropolitan area
Unincorporated communities in Florida
Former county seats in Florida